Yves-Louis Pinaud (26 March 1927 – 11 April 2008) was a French sailor. He competed in the Finn event at the 1960 Summer Olympics.

References

External links
 

1927 births
2008 deaths
French male sailors (sport)
Olympic sailors of France
Sailors at the 1960 Summer Olympics – Finn
Sportspeople from Bordeaux